The Philippine Senate Committee on Labor, Employment and Human Resources Development is a standing committee of the Senate of the Philippines.

Jurisdiction 
According to the Rules of the Senate, the committee handles all matters relating to:

 Labor, employment and human resource development
 Maintenance of industrial peace
 Promotion of employer-employee cooperation
 Labor education, standards and statistics
 Organization of the labor market including recruitment, training and placement of workers and exports of human resources
 Foreign workers in the Philippines
 Promotion and development of workers' organizations
 Promotion and development of employment-intensive technology

Members, 18th Congress 
Based on the Rules of the Senate, the Senate Committee on Labor, Employment and Human Resources Development has 13 members.

The President Pro Tempore, the Majority Floor Leader, and the Minority Floor Leader are ex officio members.

Here are the members of the committee in the 18th Congress as of September 24, 2020:

Committee secretary: Ambrosio M. Manaligod Jr.

See also 

 List of Philippine Senate committees

References 

Labor
Labor in the Philippines
Employment in the Philippines